Pongphan Wongsuwan (10 January 1951 - 4 February 2012) nicknamed Kok, was a manager of Thailand Premier League side TOT FC. He led the side to the Thailand Division 1 League title in 2003 and the Thailand Provincial League title in 2006. In the 2010 season he was the technical Director of Army United F.C. He was the younger brother of Prawit Wongsuwan, former Thailand's Minister of Defence and former National Police Chief Patcharawat Wongsuwan.

He died in February 2012.

Clubs managed

BEC Tero Sasana: 1997
TOT FC: 1998–2009

International Managed

U-17 Thailand: 1998

Honours
As manager 
Kor Royal Cup Champions : 1988 with Krung Thai Bank FC
 Thailand Coach of the Year 1988
AFC U-17 Championship Champions : 1998 with U-17 Thailand
Thai FA Cup Champions : 1993 with TOT FC
 AFC Coach of the Year 1996
Thailand Division 1 League Champions : 2003 with TOT FC
Thailand Provincial League Champions: 2006 with TOT FC

References

Pongphan Wongsuwan
1951 births
2012 deaths
Pongphan Wongsuwan
Pongphan Wongsuwan